12 Motorised Infantry Brigade (pronounced as One Two Motorised Infantry Brigade) is a brigade of the Namibian Army based at Keetmanshoop. The prefix "12" is taken from 12 May 1929, Namibia's first president's birthday day. The brigade is responsible for the defence of the southern areas of Namibia. Its subordinate units are situated in the Omaheke, Hardap, Karas and Erongo regions.

Equipment
The Brigade uses the following equipment:
Toyota Land Cruiser
Toyota Hilux
Ural Trucks

Units
The standard Namibian Infantry Brigade consists of a bde Headquarters, a transport coy, logistics coy and a medical coy supporting three Infantry battalions an artillery regiment and an air defence regiment.

124 Battalion
-Based in Oamites

125 Battalion
-Based in Walvis Bay

126 Battalion
-Based in Gobabis

12 Artillery Regiment

Leadership

References

Military of Namibia
Infantry brigades
Military units and formations established in 1999
1999 establishments in Namibia